The Winter Garden Historic Residential District is a U.S. historic district in Winter Garden, Florida. On August 1, 1996, it was added to the U.S. National Register of Historic Places.

External links

National Register of Historic Places in Orange County, Florida
Historic districts on the National Register of Historic Places in Florida
Winter Garden, Florida